Greenfield is a city in and the county seat of Hancock County, Indiana, United States It lies in Center Township and is part of the Indianapolis metropolitan area. The population was 23,488 at the 2020 census.

Greenfield was a stop along the Pittsburgh, Cincinnati, Chicago and St. Louis Railroad that connected Pittsburgh to Chicago and St. Louis.

History
Hancock County was created on March 1, 1828, and named for John Hancock, the first person to sign the Declaration of Independence. The town of Greenfield was chosen as the county seat on April 11, 1828. The Commissioners announced, "The seat of Justice of Hancock County shall be known and designated by the name and title of Greenfield." The population of the county at that time was 400.

Early settlers built along the two creeks which flow south through Center Township, which includes Greenfield. The first businesses were small gristmills for grinding corn and wheat for settlers.

U.S. Route 40, the National Road, was built through Hancock County around 1835. It was heavily traveled by wagon trains going west and livestock going to Cincinnati. In 1853, the first steam railroad was completed by the Indiana Central Railroad at the south edge of Greenfield. The railroad became part of the Pennsylvania Railroad system and later the Penn-Central. These tracks were removed in the 1980s.

During this time, Greenfield's population continued to grow. Greenfield was incorporated as a city in 1876 with a population of 2,023. The greatest single period of growth began in 1887 when natural gas was discovered in the area. Greenfield was a boomtown for 20 years, with the founding of manufacturing plants and other industries.

A statue of James Whitcomb Riley, which stands in front of the Hancock County Courthouse, was erected in 1918. It was purchased with money donated by school children from all over the United States. Each year, during the Riley Festival in October, the city's school children parade to the statue to place flowers around it.

The Charles Barr House, Greenfield Courthouse Square Historic District, Greenfield Residential Historic District, Lilly Biological Laboratories, Lincoln Park School, and James Whitcomb Riley House are listed on the National Register of Historic Places.

Geography
Greenfield is located in central Hancock County at  (39.791338, -85.771343). U.S. Route 40 passes through the center of the city as Main Street, and leads east  to Knightstown and west  to downtown Indianapolis. Interstate 70 parallels US-40, passing through the northern limits of Greenfield with access from Exit 104. I-70 leads east  to Richmond near the Ohio border and west through Indianapolis  to Terre Haute. Indiana State Road 9 (State Street) crosses US-40 in the center of Greenfield and leads north  to Pendleton and south  to Shelbyville.

Located on the east side of historic downtown lies Riley Park, in which flows the Brandywine Creek, a south-flowing tributary of the Big Blue River and part of the watershed of the East Fork White River.

Demographics

2010 census
As of the census of 2010, there were 20,602 people, 7,983 households, and 5,382 families living in the city. The racial makeup of the city was 96.6% White, 0.6% African American, 0.3% Native American, 0.8% Asian, 0.4% from other races, and 1.3% from two or more races. Hispanic or Latino of any race were 1.8% of the population.

There were 7,983 households, of which 36.8% had children under the age of 18 living with them, 49.2% were married couples living together, 12.8% had a female householder with no husband present, 5.4% had a male householder with no wife present, and 32.6% were non-families. 26.8% of all households were made up of individuals, and 10.8% had someone living alone who was 65 years of age or older. The average household size was 2.51 and the average family size was 3.04.

The median age in the city was 35.6 years. 26.4% of residents were under the age of 18; 8% were between the ages of 18 and 24; 28.7% were from 25 to 44; 23% were from 45 to 64; and 14% were 65 years of age or older. The gender makeup of the city was 48.1% male and 51.9% female.

2000 census
As of the census of 2000, there were 14,600 people, 5,917 households, and 4,017 families living in the city. The racial makeup of the city was 98.23% White, 0.05% African American, 0.21% Native American, 0.53% Asian, 0.01% Pacific Islander, 0.33% from other races, and 0.64% from two or more races. Hispanic or Latino of any race were 1.27% of the population.

There were 5,917 households, out of which 32.8% had children under the age of 18 living with them, 53.4% were married couples living together, 10.7% had a female householder with no husband present, and 32.1% were non-families. 27.4% of all households were made up of individuals, and 10.9% had someone living alone who was 65 years of age or older. The average household size was 2.41 and the average family size was 2.93.

In the city, the population was spread out, with 25.2% under the age of 18, 8.6% from 18 to 24, 30.9% from 25 to 44, 21.0% from 45 to 64, and 14.3% who were 65 years of age or older. The median age was 35 years. For every 100 females, there were 92.3 males. For every 100 females age 18 and over, there were 87.6 males.

The median income for a household in the city was $72,035, and the median income for a family was $82,408. Males had a median income of $66,188 versus $56,568 for females. The per capita income for the city was $52,509. About 3.0% of families and 4.3% of the population were below the poverty line, including 4.7% of those under age 18 and 6.2% of those age 65 or over.

Government
The government consists of a mayor and a city council. The mayor is elected in citywide vote. The city council consists of seven members. Five are elected from individual districts. Two are elected at-large.

Education
Greenfield-Central Community School Corporation services the city of Greenfield and surrounding areas in central Hancock County. It consists of four elementary schools (Grades K - 3), two intermediate schools (Grades 4 - 6), one junior high school (Grades 7 - 8), and one high school (Grades 9 - 12). Greenfield Central Jr. High School was built in the late 2000s to accommodate Greenfield's rapidly growing population. Greenfield-Central High School also underwent renovation in 2011.

List of schools - Greenfield-Central Community School Corporation
 Eden Elementary School
 Harris Elementary School
 J.B. Stephens Elementary School
 Weston Elementary School
 Greenfield Intermediate School
 Maxwell Intermediate School
 Greenfield Central Jr. High School
 Greenfield-Central High School

St. Michael's School also serves Greenfield, offering Pre-kindergarten through Grade 8. It is a private Catholic School that won the Blue Ribbon Award.

Greenfield has a public library, a branch of the Hancock County Public Library.

Industry and commerce
Businesses with headquarters and/or significant operations in Greenfield include:
 Avery Dennison: manufactures a variety of adhesive labels and adhesive backed films.
 Covance: engaged in research, development, and testing of pharmaceutical products. This facility was operated by Eli Lilly and Company until 2008.
 Cynthia's Hallmark Stores: operates four Hallmark retail stores in Central Indiana; the company's Greenfield location is the single largest in the U.S.
 Elanco: manufactures animal health products for pets and farm animals, such as pet medicines and feed additives. Formerly a division of Eli Lilly and Company, the company's global headquarters facility is located in Greenfield.
 Hancock Regional Hospital is a full-service community hospital with a focus on primary care, patient comfort, and convenience.
 Indiana Automotive Fasteners: manufactures fasteners for automotive OEMs including Toyota, Ford and Honda.
 Keihin Indiana Precision Technology: a subsidiary of Honda Motor that manufactures automotive components including intake manifolds, solenoid valves, and throttle bodies.
 Novelty, Inc.: Markets and distributes novelty items for convenience stores.
 Stanley Black & Decker: manufacture[s] industrial fasteners, various types of steel fasteners and industrial applications equipment and will assemble pneumatic tools.
 University Loft Company - Furniture Manufacturing Company and Wholesale Sales

Sister and friendship cities
Greenfield is currently in a sister city relationship with Kakuda, Miyagi Prefecture, Japan. Each year, a small group of high school students from Greenfield and Kakuda are chosen to travel to each sister city, respectively, and will stay with a host family for ten days, most expenses paid, thanks to local donations. The sister city program began in 1990 and continues today.

Notable people
 Adelia Pope Branham (1861-1917), writer
 Mark Dismore, Indy Racing League and Indianapolis 500 driver
 Yogi Ferrell, former Indiana basketball player and current Sacramento Kings player
 Kyle Gibson, pitcher  22nd overall pick in 2009 Major League Baseball Draft
 Henry C. Gooding, Indiana State Senator and Arizona Territorial Supreme Court Justice
 Omer Stokes Jackson, 28th Indiana Attorney General
 Jaycie Phelps, member of US Women's gold medalist 1996 Olympic gymnastic team
 James Whitcomb Riley, poet and writer
 Will Vawter, artist

Events
Each year in October, the city of Greenfield hosts the Riley Festival, commonly known as "Riley Days". The intersection of State Road 9 and US 40 is closed, and the downtown courthouse square is filled with vendors and exhibitors.

Media
 Radio Station WRGF 89.7 FM
 Daily Reporter - daily newspaper

References

External links
 City of Greenfield official website
 Sister Cities of Greenfield

Cities in Indiana
Cities in Hancock County, Indiana
County seats in Indiana
National Road
Indianapolis metropolitan area